Mount Bernard is a townland in County Tyrone, Northern Ireland. It is situated in the barony of Omagh West and the civil parish of Urney and covers an area of 50 acres. 

The population of the townland declined slightly during the 19th century:

See also
List of townlands of County Tyrone

References

Townlands of County Tyrone
Barony of Omagh West